Like the flags of the Weimar Republic, West Germany, and present-day Germany, the flag of East Germany, the German Democratic Republic, showed the colours black, red and gold. The coat of arms, which, from 1959, was a hammer, compass and wreath of wheat, was located in the middle of the colour red.

It was the official national flag of the German Democratic Republic (East Germany) during its existence from 1959 to 1990. The flag's design and symbolism are derived from the flag of the Weimar Republic and communist symbolism.

Symbolism and design 
With relations deteriorating between the Soviet Union and the United States, the three western Allies met in March 1948 to merge their zones of occupation and allow the formation of what became the Federal Republic of Germany, commonly known as West Germany. Meanwhile, the eastern Soviet zone became the German Democratic Republic, commonly known as East Germany. Although there were objections to the creation of a national flag before reunification with the east, it was decided to proceed. This decision was primarily motivated by the proposed constitution by the eastern SED in November 1946, where black-red-gold were suggested as the colours for a future German republic.

While there were other suggestions for the new flag for West Germany, the final choice was between two designs, both using black-red-gold. Wirmer suggested a variant of the 1944 "Resistance" flag (using the black-red-gold scheme in a Nordic Cross pattern) designed by his brother and 20 July co-conspirator Josef. The tricolour was ultimately selected, largely to illustrate the continuity between the Weimar Republic and this new German state. With the enactment of the (West) German constitution on 23 May 1949, the black-red-gold tricolour was adopted as the flag for the Federal Republic of Germany.

In 1955, the inhabitants of the French-administered Saar Protectorate voted to join West Germany. Since its establishment as a separate French protectorate in 1947, the Saar had a white Nordic cross on a blue and red background as its flag. To demonstrate the commitment of the Saar to be a part of West Germany, a new flag was selected on 9 July 1956: the black-red-gold tricolour defaced with the new coat of arms, also proposed on this day. This flag came into force on 1 January 1957, upon the establishment of the Saarland as a state of West Germany.

While the use of black-red-gold had been suggested in the Soviet zone in 1946, the Second People's Congress in 1948 decided to adopt the old black-white-red tricolour as a national flag for East Germany. This choice was based on the use of these colours by the National Committee for a Free Germany, a German anti-Nazi organisation that operated in the Soviet Union in the last two years of the war. In 1949, following a suggestion from Friedrich Ebert Jr., the black-red-gold tricolour was instead selected as the flag of the German Democratic Republic upon the formation of this state on 7 October 1949. From 1949 to 1959, the flags of both West and East Germany were identical. On 1 October 1959, the East German government changed its flag with the addition of coat of arms. In West Germany, these changes were seen as a deliberate attempt to divide the two Germanies.

Colour scheme: valid for East German flags 1949–1990

The colours video approximation is listed below:

From 1956 to 1964, West and East Germany attended the Winter and Summer Olympic Games as a single team, known as the United Team of Germany. After the East German national flag was changed in 1959, neither country accepted the flag of the other. As a compromise, a new flag was used by the United Team of Germany from 1960 to 1964, featuring the black-red-gold tricolour defaced with white Olympic rings in the red stripe. In 1968 for both the Winter games in France and the Summer games in Mexico, the teams from the two German states entered separately, but both used the same German Olympic flag. From 1972 to 1988, the separate West and East German teams used their respective national flags.

History 

On the centenary of the Berlin March days in March 1948, the second People's Congress was convened in Berlin, seen as a German People's Council on the reorganization of the entire state  in addition to the drafting of a constitution creating a national flag for the state of the German Democratic Republic. The choice was between three flags, one red, another black-white-red, and the last option black-red-gold. The proposal to introduce the red flag, was quickly discarded. As a sign of communist and the international labor movement this flag was rejected even during the November Revolution of 1918 (and beyond) by the bourgeoisie. As in Germany, the decision was made in favor of the black, red and gold flag of the Weimar Republic. The Soviet Union was initially against this flag. As a symbol of the Weimar Republic it was a reminder of an era of weakness, crises, and unemployment. Thus, the black-white-red German Fatherland Flag flag remained. It goes back to the National Committee for a Free Germany. The committee was established on 12 and 13 June 1943 under Soviet leadership and took the old Reich flag, to be seen as signs of the struggle against the fascist Nazi regime are evaluated in Adolf Hitler and the swastika flag. The Third People's Congress 1949, set up by the Soviet occupation in 1948, brought Mayor of East Berlin Friedrich Ebert yet again, and the proposal for the black-red-gold flag.  His application was approved on 30 May 1949 and put into effect on 7 October 1949 Law on state emblem and flag from 26 September 1949.

Thus, the West (FRG) and East Germany (GDR) had the same national flag. The East, however, led only in the first ten years of its existence. During this time the FRG competed in color with the identical design of the GDR. On 1 October 1959 the GDR added their national emblem, "hammer and compass surrounded by a garland of corn" in the flag as so as to create a distinction to the flag of the Federal Republic. The emblem was a symbol of the alliance of between workers, farmers, and intelligentsia.

The public presentation of this officially as a "Soviet zone flag" designated by the FRG flag was, however, viewed by the end of the 1960s as a breach of the Constitution and disruption of public order in the FRG and West Berlin and basically prevented by police action. Even when hoisting the flag of the GDR abroad there were stereotyped to West German protests. It was only on 22 July 1969 ordered the federal government (Grand Coalition), that the police everywhere should take more no action against the use of the flag and coat of arms of the GDR.

Since the situation regarding the recognition of the GDR under international law was complicated as a result of the Hallstein Doctrine, it started to be in 1968 in sporting contests, such as in Olympic Games, teams with athletes from both parts of Germany. The Olympic Committee of the GDR refused to compete under the flag of the Federal Republic, and the Olympic Committee of Germany took until the very last moment before deciding to carry the black-red-gold flag unchanged. Ultimately an agreement was made to place the Olympic rings in white over the red stripe of the black, red and gold flag. As part of the international recognition of the GDR by the United Nations and the recognition of the sovereignty of the GDR by the FRG, two separate teams with two separate flags took part since the 1972 Winter Olympics.

With the introduction of the new national flag in 1959 a new merchant flag was introduced. Before the GDR led the black-red-gold flag without coat of arms as merchant flag. The new merchant flag to a smaller state emblem is in the upper corner. 1973 this merchant flag was again abolished and replaced by the national flag, the order was National and merchant flag.

In addition to the East German flag, the red flag of the workers' movement was often hoisted at public buildings, at official events and on national holidays. Only on the Brandenburg Gate did two red flags fly to the left and right of the GDR state flag in the middle until the days after the Berlin Wall fell.

After the political turning point in 1989 in the GDR drew up the working group "New Constitution of the GDR," the Round Table a new constitution  and proposed a new national flag. They should continue to be striped black-red-golden, but show instead of the State Emblem the presentation of the motto Swords to ploughshares. The other political events with the reunification ending existence of the GDR did not let the Constitution and therefore the new flag to take effect.

War and service flags 
The flags of the military units of the GDR bore the national coat of arms with a wreath of two olive branches on a red background, on a black, red and gold flag.

The flags of the People's Navy for combat ships and boats carried the coat of arms with an olive branch wreath on a red flag cloth, for auxiliary ships and boats on a blue flag cloth with a narrow black, red and gold band arranged in the middle. The state flag was used in a reduced form as a Gösch.

The ships and boats of the border brigade coast on the Baltic Sea, and the boats of the border troops of the GDR on the Elbe and Oder carried a green bar on the leech, as did the service flag of the border troops.

Presidential Standards

Historical flags

Gallery

See also 

 National emblem of East Germany
 Gallery of sovereign state flags
 List of German flags

References

External links 

East Germany
National symbols of East Germany
East Germany
1949 establishments in East Germany
East Germany